Dinko Mulić (born 8 September 1983 in Bihać, Bosnia and Herzegovina) is a Bosnian-born Croatian slalom canoer who has competed since the late 1990s. Until 2003 he represented Bosnia and Herzegovina. Competing in the 2004 Summer Olympics in Athens in the K-1 event, he finished twenty-second in the qualification round, failing to progress to the semifinals. He recorded the same result in the K-1 event at the 2012 Summer Olympics in London.

References
Sports-Reference.com profile
Overview of athlete's results at canoeslalom.net

1983 births
Canoeists at the 2004 Summer Olympics
Canoeists at the 2012 Summer Olympics
Croatian male canoeists
Living people
Olympic canoeists of Croatia
People from Bihać